Sawnee Mountain is a low mountain between the piedmont and Appalachian foothills of the U.S. state of Georgia, north of Atlanta. Average rainfall/46.26in/yr/ average snowfall/5.7in/yr/. The name Sawnee Mountain actually refers to the entire ridge of approximately five miles (8 km) in length. The Sawnee Mountain range runs southwest to northeast, and consists of five knolls and three gaps (Chamblee, Sawnee, and Bettes). Located only a few miles north of Cumming, Georgia (the county seat), the mountain is easily the highest point in Forsyth county. One of the highest peaks of metro Atlanta, it nudges out its prominently known neighbors Stone Mountain and Kennesaw Mountain by a hundred or so feet each. However, Sawnee is in the far northern exurbs, putting it in third place behind Bear Mountain and Pine Log Mountain to the west.

Sawnee Mountain Preserve

The Sawnee Mountain Preserve protects 963 acres of the mountain and is managed by the Natural Resource Management Division of Forsyth County Parks and Recreation.

The Visitor Center features interactive exhibits about the natural and cultural histories of Sawnee Mountain, and a resource library and lounge.  Environmental education programs are offered for school, scout and other groups, and a summer camp program is operated by the County.

History
It is believed that Native Americans may have used a natural clearing atop the mountain called the Indian Seats for  ceremonial purposes.  As white settlers migrated to the area, now known as Cumming, a local Cherokee named Sawnee helped them adjust to the native land.  As a well skilled carpenter and farmer he was known throughout the land, and the range was named in his honor.  In 1829 gold was discovered in Georgia in Auraria at the site of America's first gold rush.  There are also mines in the ridges of Sawnee which is downstream the Chattahoochee from the major strike.  Current uses of the mountain are as a nature preserve park and a Radio station, WWEV-FM 91.5, which transmits from a radio tower at the top of the mountain.  Originally, the station staff actually drove recorded programming to the top where it played from broadcast automation equipment, but it now uses a live studio/transmitter link.  The Sawnee Mountain Visitor Center is located at 4075 Spot Road and is one of the trailheads.

See also
List of mountains in Georgia (U.S. state)

References

External links

 Sawnee Mountain Preserve - official site

Mountains of Georgia (U.S. state)
Landforms of Forsyth County, Georgia
Ridges of Georgia (U.S. state)
Protected areas of Forsyth County, Georgia
Nature reserves in Georgia (U.S. state)
Nature centers in Georgia (U.S. state)